Pseudochalcothea  is a genus of beetles  of the family Scarabaeidae, subfamily Cetoniinae.

List of Species
There are 15 species in this Genus:

 Pseudochalcothea auripes
 Pseudochalcothea compacta
 Pseudochalcothea kalimantanica
 Pseudochalcothea macrophylla
 Pseudochalcothea nagaii
 Pseudochalcothea nishikawai
 Pseudochalcothea planiuscula
 Pseudochalcothea pomacea
 Pseudochalcothea ritsemae
 Pseudochalcothea sakaii
 Pseudochalcothea shelfordi
 Pseudochalcothea spathulifera
 Pseudochalcothea staudingeri
 Pseudochalcothea virens
 Pseudochalcothea viridipes

References
Zipcodezoo
Biolib

Cetoniinae